The 161st Intelligence Squadron (161 IS) is a unit of the 184th Wing of the Kansas Air National Guard stationed at McConnell Air Force Base, Wichita, Kansas.  The 161st is a non-flying squadron operating the Distributed Common Ground System.

History

This squadron was Initially constituted and allotted to the Kansas Air National Guard on 29 March 2006. and assigned to the 184th Air Refueling Wing (now 184th Wing) Wing, McConnell Air Force Base. The unit was constituted and allotted to the Kansas Air National Guard on 01 April 2008 as the 161st Intelligence Squadron, falling under Air Combat Command.

On 1 July 2008, the unit was assigned to the 184th Intelligence Group, under the 184th Intelligence Wing, Kansas Air National Guard, McConnell Air Force Base.

The 161st Intelligence Squadron received federal recognition effective 2 June 2010.

Lineage
 The 161st Intelligence Squadron does NOT share the lineage of the 161st Tactical Fighter Training Squadron.

Assignments
 184th Air Refueling Wing 29 March 2006-1 April 2008
 184th Intelligence Wing, 1 April 2008 – 30 June 2008
 184th Intelligence Group, 1 July 2008 – 31 August 2015
 184 Intelligence, Surveillance, and Reconnaissance Group (184 ISRG), 1 Sep 2015–present

Stations 
 McConnell Air Force Base, Kansas,  29 March 2006 – Present

Aircraft
 None

References

Notes

Bibliography

 1.Burrus, M. (24 July 2008). "OAL 08-32-ORganization Actions for the 184th Air Refueling Wing," Air National Guard Manpower Memorandum.  
 2.DAF/A1M 170t, (26 March 2006). National Guard Bureau Form 5.  
 3.Johnson, H. (10 August 2015). "OAL 15–17 – Air national Guard Intelligence Group Redesignations (MA, IN, KS)," DAF/A1M Manpower Memorandum.
 4.King, C. G. (2006) "OAL 06-01-Activation of the 161st Intelligence Squadron," National Guard Bureau Manpower Memorandum.  
 5.Smith, A.C.(2006) "Allotment of the 161st Intelligence Squadron," DAF/DPM 678s memorandum.
Original documents reside with National Guard Bureau. Copy of documents reside with 184 Intelligence Wing.

External links

Squadrons of the United States Air National Guard
0161
Military units and formations in Kansas
Military units and formations established in 2006
2006 establishments in Kansas